Calathea hagbergii is a species of flowering plant in the family Marantaceae. It is endemic to Ecuador, where it is known from only a single collection.

References

hagbergii
Endemic flora of Ecuador
Endangered plants
Plants described in 1988
Taxonomy articles created by Polbot